Events from the year 1739 in art.

Events
 Royal sculptor Edme Bouchardon is commissioned to design the Fontaine des Quatre-Saisons in Paris.

Paintings

 Francis Bindon – Portrait of Dean Jonathan Swift (for Chapter of St Patrick's Cathedral, Dublin)
 François Boucher – The Breakfast
 Joseph Parrocel – Saint Francis Regis Interceding for the Plague Victims
 Antoine Pesne – Portrait of Frederick the Great as Crown Prince
 Francesco Carlo Rusca – Portrait of Lady Mary Wortley Montagu
 Paul Troger – Apotheosis of Charles VI as Apollo (fresco for Imperial staircase ceiling at Göttweig Abbey, Austria)

Births
 February 23 - Peter Adolf Hall, Swedish-French artist primarily of miniature paintings (died 1793)
 ?August – Francis Towne, English water-colour painter (died 1816)
 August 21 – Mariano Salvador Maella, Spanish painter and engraver (died 1819)
 October 3 – Valentine Green, engraver (died 1813)
 date unknown
 Antoine Cardon, also known as Cardon the Elder, Belgian painter, portraitist and engraver (died 1822)
 Nicolas Benjamin Delapierre, French artist (died 1800)
 Kitao Shigemasa, Japanese ukiyo-e artist from Edo (died 1820)
 Giuseppe Levati, Italian painter and designer of the late-Baroque and Neoclassicism period (died 1828)
 probable – Deng Shiru, Chinese calligrapher during the Qing Dynasty (died 1805)

Deaths
 January 20 – Francesco Galli Bibiena, Italian architect/designer/painter (born 1659)
 March 31 – Magnus Berg, Norwegian painter, woodcarver, sculptor and non-fiction writer (born 1666)
 April 23 - Andrey Matveyev, Russian portraitist (born 1702)
 April 27 – Pierre Imbert Drevet, French portrait engraver (born 1697)
 May 10 – Cosmas Damian Asam, German Baroque painter and architect (born 1686)
 June 27 – Thomas Wedgwood III, potter (born 1685)
 July 15 – Juan Ramírez Mejandre, Spanish Baroque sculptor (born 1680)
 December 23 – John Vanderbank, English portrait painter and book illustrator (born 1694)
 date unknown
 Charles Jervas, Irish portrait painter, translator, and art collector (born 1675)
 Carlo Moscatiello, Italian painter of quadratura (born 1650)

 
Years of the 18th century in art
1730s in art